Bonne nouvelle (French "good news") or Bonne Nouvelle may refer to:

Geography

Paris
Bonne-Nouvelle (:fr:Quartier de Bonne-Nouvelle), in the 2nd arrondissement of Paris
Notre-Dame de Bonne-Nouvelle, Paris
Bonne Nouvelle (Paris Métro)

Broadcasting and companies
Radio Bonne Nouvelle WYGG Haitian radio station in New Jersey
Radio Bonne Nouvelle, Gabon List of television networks by country
Bonne Nouvelle, South Africa Michel Rolland

Music
Bonne nouvelle (Natasha St-Pier album)

Songs
"Bonne nouvelle", song on the album Beaux Dégâts Francis Cabrel
"Bonne Nouvelle" by Natasha St-Pier Bonne nouvelle (Natasha St-Pier album) composed by Simeo
"Bonne Nouvelle" by Jean Yves d'Angelo
"Bonne Nouvelle" by Birdy Nam Nam
"Bonne Nouvelle" by Orchestra Baobab Benoit Tranle / Manuel Merlot / Ouafi Djakliou / William Jarry
"Bonne Nouvelle" by Verdena